Wisin vs. Yandel: Los Extraterrestres is the fifth studio album by Puerto Rican reggaeton duo Wisin & Yandel, released on November 6, 2007, by Machete Music. On November 13, 2008, the album received the Latin Grammy Award for Best Urban Music Album and Lo Nuestro Award for Urban Album of the Year. Also, the album won Grammy Award for Best Latin Urban Album on 2009. To promote the album the artists embarked on the "Los Extraterrestres Tour".

Los Extraterrestres debuted at number 14 on Billboard 200 with selling over 53,000 copies. The album sold over 430,000 copies making it the top selling Latin album of United States of 2008,  and more than 1.5 million copies worldwide making it one of the best selling reggeton albums of all time.

Critical reception

Jason Birchmeier of Allmusic gave the album four stars out of five, calling it "good news for those who enjoy state-of-the-art reggaeton without any experimentation" and specifically mentioning that "the employment of first-rate producers Nesty, Tainy, El Nasi, and Monserrate and DJ Urba in the place of Wisin & Yandel's former beatmakers-in-chief, Luny Tunes, ensures the quality of the music." He summarized the review by saying that "the result is a new-yet-familiar album sure to please the duo's fan base, and likely grow it as well as the hits mount."

Chart and Commercial performance
The album entered the Billboard 200 at number 14, the fourth highest rank in reggaeton history, shared only by King of Kings (Don Omar) which peaked at number 7, El Cartel: The Big Boss (Daddy Yankee), which peaked at number 9, and Talento de Barrio (Daddy Yankee), which peaked at number 12. It sold over 53,000 copies in the first week in the United States and It peaked at number 1 on the Billboard Top Latin Albums chart and at the year-end charts of 2008, this album ranked at number one.  It has been certified 3× Platinum by the RIAA Latino. During the 2008, the album sold 250,000 copies making it the second best Latin selling album in the United States of that year. As of May 2009, the album sold 434,000 copies.

The album was a commercial success in Latin America. In Mexico, it debuted at number 26 and was certified Gold for selling 40,000 copies. Also, it was certified Platinum in Colombia and Venezuela. By 2016, the album had sold 1.5 million copies.

Track listing

Charts and certifications

Weekly charts

Year-end charts

Certifications

Credits and personnel

Executive Producers
Gustavo Lopez
Juan Luis Morera
Llandel Veguilla
A&R
Carolina Arenas
A&R Coordinator
Aldo Gonzalez
Mixed by
Marioso
Production Coordinator
Ana Alvarado

Mastering
Sterling Studio
Tom Coyne
Public Relations
Halo Communications
Lourdes Perez
Photography
Edwin David
Creative & Art Direction
Iancarlo "Conqui" Reyes
Michelle "Huracan Castigo" Benitez

Release history

Accolades

See also
List of number-one Billboard Latin Rhythm Albums of 2007

References

Wisin & Yandel albums
Machete Music albums
2007 albums
Latin Grammy Award for Best Urban Music Album